Samuel Thomas Whiddon (26 June 1848 – 20 September 1905) was an English-born Australian politician.

He was born in London to plasterer Samuel Whiddon and Sarah Fossey. The family migrated to Sydney in 1853 and Whiddon worked as a messenger boy for T. Williams & Co., a boot manufacturing business that he eventually owned. In 1894 he was elected to the New South Wales Legislative Assembly as the Free Trade member for Sydney-Cook. He held the seat until his retirement in 1904. Whiddon died at Glebe in 1905.

References

 

1848 births
1905 deaths
Members of the New South Wales Legislative Assembly
Free Trade Party politicians
19th-century Australian politicians